The men's team competition at the 2009 European Team Judo Championships was held on 3 October at the Miskolc Sports Hall in Miskolc, Hungary.

Results

Group A

Bracket
Playoff bracket:

References

External links
 

Mteam
European Men's Team Judo Championships
EU 2009